The Military ranks of Tunisia are the military insignia used by the Tunisian Armed Forces and the Tunisian National Guard. Tunisia shares a rank structure similar to that of France.

Commissioned officer ranks
The rank insignia of commissioned officers.

Other ranks
The rank insignia of non-commissioned officers and enlisted personnel.

References

External links
 
 

Tunisia
Military of Tunisia
Tunisia